Secret Curve is a 2011 album by Ron Anderson's PAK. It was released on John Zorn's Tzadik label as part of the composer series.

Track listing
"Overture"
"Let Me Tell You Something"
"Caffeine Static Rendezvous"
"No Future"
"Caro-Kann"
"Secret Curve"
"Mama’s Little Anarchist"
"E4 or D4?"
"Trebuchet"
"Blinding Light"
"Kempelen's Automaton"

Personnel
Ron Anderson: Bass Guitar
Keith Abrams: Drums, Percussion
Tim Byrnes: Trumpet, French Horn, Keyboards
Anthony Coleman: Piano
Jérôme Noetinger: Electronics, Tape Manipulation
Eve Risser: Piano, Prepared Piano
Tom Swafford: Violin
Stefan Zeniuk: Clarinet, Bass Clarinet, Tenor Saxophone, Bass Saxophone, English Horn

The Ashfield Sessions
Anderson released an earlier version of the compositions on Secret Curve as a limited edition live CDR called The Ashfield Sessions in 2008. 150 hand numbered copies were made. Alex Lozupone said about the material "The new Pak has a tendency to fall into grooves more easily than the old (Ron is a bassist now!), which makes for a different sound - not a bad thing at all.".

References

2011 albums